Minuscule 929 (in the Gregory-Aland numbering), δ 478 (von Soden), is a 13th-century Greek minuscule manuscript of the New Testament on parchment. It has marginalia and was prepared for liturgical use. The manuscript has survived in complete condition.

Description 

The codex contains the text of the four Gospels, on 214 parchment leaves (size ). The text is written in one column per page, 26-30 lines per page.
The leaves of the codex are arranged in octavo.
According to Hermann von Soden it is an ornamented manuscript It contains the Eusebian Canon tables at the beginning and portraits of the Evangelists (except John Evangelist) before each Gospel.

Text 

The Greek text of the codex is a representative of the Byzantine. Hermann von Soden classified it to the textual family Kx. Kurt Aland did not place it in any Category.
According to the Claremont Profile Method it belongs to the textual family Kx in Luke 1 and Luke 20. In Luke 10 no profile was made.

History 

The manuscript was dated by Gregory to the 13th century. Currently it is dated by the INTF to the 13th century. The codex 929 was seen by Gregory at the Dionysiou monastery (8), in Mount Athos. Currently the manuscript is housed at the Dionysiou monastery (52 (12)) in Athos.

The manuscript was added to the list of New Testament manuscripts by C. R. Gregory (929e). It was not on the Scrivener's list, but it was added to his list by Edward Miller in the 4th edition of A Plain Introduction to the Criticism of the New Testament.

It is not cited in critical editions of the Greek New Testament (UBS4, NA28).

See also 

 List of New Testament minuscules (1–1000)
 Biblical manuscript
 Textual criticism

References

Further reading

External links 
 

Greek New Testament minuscules
13th-century biblical manuscripts
Athos manuscripts
Dionysiou Monastery